Nassarius lawsonorum is a species of sea snail, a marine gastropod mollusk in the family Nassariidae, the Nassa mud snails or dog whelks.

Description

Distribution
This species occurs in the Indian Ocean off Mozambique and South Africa.

References

 Marais J.P. & Kilburn R.N. (2010) Nassariidae. pp. 138–173, in: Marais A.P. & Seccombe A.D. (eds), Identification guide to the seashells of South Africa. Volume 1. Groenkloof: Centre for Molluscan Studies. 376 pp

Nassariidae
Gastropods described in 2000